Insomnia is a hip-hop compilation album presented by American rapper and record producer Erick Sermon. It was released on April 23, 1996 via Interscope Records. Recording sessions took place at Mirror Image, at the Music Palace, and at Rockin' Reel Recording Studios in New York, and at Chuck Simone Studio. Production was handled primarily by Sermon, who also served as executive producer, Redman, and co-producers Rockwilder and Ty Fyffe. Beside Sermon, it features contributions from fellow artists affiliated with or discovered by him, such as Calif, Domo, Duo, Jamal, Keith Murray, L.O.D., Passion, Redman, The Wixtons, Xross-Breed, and Thomas "Tommy Gunn" Blincoe, who was murdered shortly before the album's release, and to whom this album is dedicated. The album peaked at number 53 on the Billboard 200 and number 10 on the Top R&B/Hip-Hop Albums in the United States. It spawned three singles: "Funkorama", which peacked at No. 81 on the Billboard Hot 100, "It's That Hit" and "I Feel It".

Track listing

Sample credits
Track 2 contains sample of "Midnight" as performed by A Tribe Called Quest and elements from "Stick 'Em" as performed by The Fat Boys
Track 5 contains sample of "Black Thorne Rose" as performed by Weather Report
Track 6 contains sample of "Bootzilla" as performed by Bootsy's Rubber Band, a sample of "Impeach the President" as performed by The Honeydrippers and a portion of the composition "I Want to Thank You"
Track 9 contains elements from "Funkin' For Jamaica" as performed by The Mindbenders and elements from "The Show" as performed by Doug E. Fresh
Track 10 contains sample from "Aah...The Name Is Bootsy, Baby"
Track 13 contains a sample of "All Night Long" as performed by the Mary Jane Girls

Personnel

Erick Sermon – executive producer, vocals (track 13), producer (tracks: 4-7, 9-13), co-producer (track 2), sleeve notes
Reginald "Redman" Noble – vocals (track 2), producer (tracks: 2, 3), sleeve notes
L. "Kewjo" Scott – vocals (track 3), sleeve notes
Dana "Rockwilder" Stinson – vocals (track 3), co-producer (track 5), sleeve notes
Passion Johnson – vocals (track 4), sleeve notes
Jamal "Mally G" Phillips – vocals (track 5), sleeve notes
Calif Moore – vocals (track 5), sleeve notes
Keith Murray – vocals (track 6), sleeve notes
The Wixtons – vocals (track 7)
Gerald "50 Grand" Berlin – vocals (track 9), sleeve notes
Ron "Ron Jay" Joseph – vocals (track 9), sleeve notes
T. "T-Man" Stanley – vocals (track 10), sleeve notes
Kim "Big Kim" Sermon – vocals (track 10), sleeve notes
Thomas "Tommy Gunn" Blincoe – vocals (track 11), sleeve notes
Domo Paige – vocals (track 12), sleeve notes
Deborah "Cherry Martinez" Tennyson – voice (tracks: 1, 8)
Tyrone "Ty" Fyffe – co-producer (track 7)
Troy Hightower – recording, mixing
Bob Fudjinski – recording
Chuck Simone – recording
Dave Greenberg – recording
Tommy Uzzo – mixing
Tony Dawsey – mastering
Mike Hogan – engineering assistant
Cathrine Wessel – photography
Jah Boogie – sleeve notes
Shugar Diamonds – sleeve notes

Chart history

References

External links

1996 compilation albums
Albums produced by Erick Sermon
East Coast hip hop compilation albums
Interscope Records compilation albums